"Rabbit rabbit rabbit" is a superstition found in Britain and North America wherein a person says or repeats the words "rabbit", "rabbits" and/or "white rabbits" aloud upon waking on the first day of a month, to ensure good luck for the rest of it.

Origins and history
The exact origin of the superstition is unknown, though it was recorded in Notes and Queries as being said by children in 1909:

In response to this note another contributor said that his daughter believed that the outcome would be a present, and that the word must be spoken up the chimney to be most effective; another pointed out that the word rabbit was often used in expletives, and suggested that the superstition may be a survival of the ancient belief in swearing as a means of avoiding evil. People continue to express curiosity about the origins of this superstition and draw upon it for inspiration in making calendars suggestive of the Labors of the Months, thus linking the rabbit rabbit superstition to seasonal fertility.

It appeared in a work of fiction in 1922:

Chapter 1 of the Trixie Belden story The Mystery of the Emeralds (1962) is titled "Rabbit! Rabbit!" and discusses the tradition:

In the United States the tradition appears especially well known in northern New England although, like all folklore, determining its exact area of distribution is difficult. The superstition may be related to the broader belief in the rabbit or hare being a "lucky" animal, as exhibited in the practice of carrying a rabbit's foot for luck. Rabbits have not always been thought of as lucky, however. In the 19th century, for example, fishermen would not say the word while at sea; in South Devon, to see a white rabbit in one's village when a person was very ill was regarded as a sure sign that the person was about to die.

During the mid-1990s, the American children's cable channel Nickelodeon helped popularize the superstition in the United States as part of its "Nick Days", where during commercial breaks it would show an ad about the significance of the current date, whether it be an actual holiday, a largely uncelebrated unofficial holiday, or a made-up day if nothing else is going on that specific day (the latter would be identified as a "Nickelodeon holiday"). Nickelodeon would promote the last day of each month as "Rabbit Rabbit Day" and to remind kids to say it the next day, unless the last day of that specific month was an actual holiday, such as Halloween or New Year's Eve. This practice stopped by the late 1990s.

In other traditions

There is another folk tradition which may use a variation "Rabbit", "Bunny", "I hate/love Grey Rabbits" or "White Rabbit" to ward off smoke that the wind is directing into your face when gathered around a campfire. It is thought that this tradition may be related to the tradition of invoking the rabbit on the first of the month. Others conjecture that it may originate with a North American First Nation story about smoke resembling rabbit fur. This tradition may be more of a social tradition in a group setting than a genuine belief that certain words will change the wind direction, and may be more of a childhood tradition than an adult one. Children have sometimes adapted from Rabbit to "Pink Elephant" or other comical derivatives. Because of this more mutable usage, historical record of this is even more scarce than other more static meanings.

Variants

As with most folklore, which is traditionally spread by word of mouth, there are numerous variants of the superstition, in some cases specific to a certain time period or region.
 "When I was a very little boy I was advised to always murmur 'White rabbits' on the first of every month if I wanted to be lucky. From sheer force of unreasoning habit I do it still—when I think of it. I know it to be preposterously ludicrous, but that does not deter me." – Sir Herbert Russell, 1925.
 "Even Mr. Roosevelt, the President of the United States, has confessed to a friend that he says 'Rabbits' on the first of every month—and, what is more, he would not think of omitting the utterance on any account." – newspaper article, 1935.
 "On the first day of the month say 'Rabbit! rabbit! rabbit!' and the first thing you know you will get a present from someone you like very much." Collected by the researcher Frank C. Brown in North Carolina in the years between 1913 and 1943.
 "If you say 'Rabbit, rabbit, rabbit' the first thing when you wake up in the morning on the first of each month you will have good luck all month." Collected by Wayland D. Hand in Pennsylvania before 1964.
 "Say 'Rabbit, rabbit, rabbit' at the first of the month for good luck and money." Collected by Ernest W. Baughman in New Mexico before 1964.
 "...it must be 'White Rabbit' ... but you must also say 'Brown Rabbit' at night and walk downstairs backwards." Reported in a small survey that took place in Exeter, Devon in 1972.
"Ever since I was 4 years old, I have said 'White Rabbits' at the very moment of waking on every single first day of every single month that has passed." Simon Winchester, 2006.
 "...the more common version 'rabbit, rabbit, white rabbit' should be said upon waking on the first day of each new month to bring good luck." Sunday Mirror, 2007.

See also
 Three hares
 Rabbit's foot
Stamping (custom)
 "Pinch and a punch for the first of the month"

References

Further reading
 Cavendish, Richard – Man, Myth, & Magic Volume 9. BPC Publishing, 1970
 Cavendish, Richard – Man, Myth, & Magic Volume 17. BPC Publishing, 1970
 Knapp, Mary – One Potato, Two Potato: The Folklore of American Children W. W. Norton & Company, 1978

External links
 On the White Rabbit Theory – An attempt to catalogue different "rabbit rabbit" variations and determine their origins.
 The Psychic Well Superstitions About Rabbits

Luck
Superstitions of Great Britain
Superstitions of the United States
Leporidae